PQC can refer to:

 Post-quantum cryptography
 Phu Quoc International Airport
 Paul Quinn College